Inesa Jurevičiūtė (born 19 March 1985 in Kaunas) is a Lithuanian retired figure skater. She is the 2000 Lithuanian national champion. She withdrew from the 2001 World Figure Skating Championships just before the event. She also competed in ice dancing on the national level with Marius Janeliauskas, with whom she is the 1998 Lithuanian silver medalist.

References
 

Lithuanian female single skaters
Lithuanian female ice dancers
1985 births
Living people
Sportspeople from Kaunas